Arthur César Reis Castro (born 7 January 1997), commonly known as Arthur Bote, is a Brazilian professional footballer who plays as a defender.

Career statistics

Club

Notes

References

1997 births
Living people
Brazilian footballers
Brazilian expatriate footballers
Association football defenders
Santos FC players
S.U. Sintrense players
Sertanense F.C. players
Ergotelis F.C. players
Super League Greece 2 players
Liga III
Brazilian expatriate sportspeople in Greece
Expatriate footballers in Greece
Brazilian expatriate sportspeople in Romania
Expatriate footballers in Romania